Orsa Municipality (Orsa kommun) is a municipality in Dalarna County in central Sweden. Its seat is located in the town of Orsa.

Orsa is one of a few municipalities in Sweden which has not been amalgamated, but retains its area from the time it was instituted as a municipal entity in 1863.

Geography 
The town of Orsa is located on the north-eastern shore of the  large Lake Orsa (Orsasjön). Through a southern water passage it is connected with one of Sweden's largest lakes: Siljan.

By the shores of Orsasjön the Orsa Camping was inaugurated in 1932. With a kilometer long sandy beach, it has received several awards for its quality and beauty, and is by some referred to as the Dalarna Riviera.

Nature sights include the Grönklitt mountain, that houses a notable bear park and skiing hill. The bear park is an enclosed area where not only bears but also wolves, lynx, siberian tigers and wolverines reside, and is the biggest bear park in northern Europe.

Localities 
 Orsa (seat)
 Skattungbyn

Riksdag elections

Notable natives
Gustaf de Laval, 19th century inventor
Orsa Spelmän, musicians/fiddlers
Gunnar Myrdal, economist, politician, and Nobel laureate
Kalle Moraeus, musician, TV personality
Melker Jernberg, Melker Jernberg became president of Volvo Construction Equipment and member of the Volvo Group executive board on January 1, 2018

References

External links

Orsa Municipality – Official site
 Walk of Orsa Famous personalities from Orsa (official site)

Municipalities of Dalarna County